Mozambique is a 1964 British drama film directed by Robert Lynn from a screenplay by Peter Yeldham, starring Steve Cochran in his final film role, Hildegard Knef, Paul Hubschmid and Vivi Bach.

Premise
An American pilot assists the Portuguese colonial police who are battling a gang of criminals involved in drug smuggling from Lisbon via Mozambique to Zanzibar.

Cast
 Steve Cochran as Brad Webster
 Hildegard Knef as Ilona Valdez
 Paul Hubschmid as Commarro
 Vivi Bach as Christina
 Dietmar Schönherr as Henderson
 Martin Benson as Da Silva
 George Leech as Carl
 Gert Van den Bergh as Arab

Production
During the making of the film, Cochran was arrested for committing adultery with the wife of a jockey while in Durban, South Africa.

Reception
The New York Times called it "a sleazy little melodrama."

References

External links
 
 Mozambique at the BFI
 Review at Spinning Image
 Review at Cinema Retro

1964 films
1964 drama films
British drama films
1960s English-language films
English-language South African films
Films directed by Robert Lynn
Films scored by Johnny Douglas
British Lion Films films
Films set in Mozambique
Films shot in Mozambique
South African drama films
1960s British films